Partula langfordi is a species of air-breathing land snail, a terrestrial pulmonate gastropod mollusk in the family Partulidae. This species is known by the common name Langford's tree snail and endemic to the Northern Mariana Islands.

References

Partula (gastropod)
Fauna of the Northern Mariana Islands
Gastropods described in 1970
Taxonomy articles created by Polbot
ESA endangered species